Euphrasia nemorosa,the common eyebright, is a hemiparasitic, annual species of flowering plant in the family Orobanchaceae. It is native to Europe and has been introduced to North America and New Zealand. It is the commonest species of Euphrasia in Britain and Ireland.

References 

nemorosa